SGIO may refer to:

SGIO (Western Australia)
State Government Insurance Office (Queensland)